Leonidio Football Club is a Greek football club, based in Leonidio, Arcadia, Greece

Honours

Domestic

  Arcadia FCA Champions: 7
 1971–72, 1973–74, 1981–82, 1983–84, 1990–91, 1996–97, 2016–17
  Arcadia FCA Cup Winners: 9
 1973–74, 1976–77, 1979–80, 1984–85, 1990–91, 1997–98, 1998–99, 2007–08, 2016–17

References

Arcadia, Peloponnese
Association football clubs established in 1969
1969 establishments in Greece
Gamma Ethniki clubs